Alexander Henderson (March 2, 1738 – November 22, 1815) was a merchant and politician in the British colony and American state of Virginia.

Biography

Henderson was born in Glasgow, Scotland. He married Sarah Moore ca. 1769. He was the father of Archibald Henderson, the longest-serving Commandant of the United States Marine Corps, who served from 1820 to 1859. He moved to Colchester, Virginia in 1756.

Henderson served in the Virginia militia during the American Revolution. He represented Fairfax County in the Virginia House of Delegates 1783–1784 and Prince William County 1789–1790.

He was a Virginia delegate to the Mount Vernon Conference in 1785 which led to the Constitutional Convention of 1787. He also served as a vestryman at Pohick Church and a magistrate of Fairfax and Prince William Counties.

Henderson moved to Dumfries, Virginia in 1787, where his home, Henderson House still stands. There he opened a store with additional outlets later opening in Colchester, Occoquan, and Alexandria and leading him to be considered the "father of the American chain store."

Death
Henderson died on November 22, 1815 in Prince William, Virginia. He was buried at the Henderson Cemetery.

References

External links

Alexander Henderson at the Historical Marker Database.

1738 births
1815 deaths
American businesspeople
Members of the Virginia House of Delegates
Virginia militiamen in the American Revolution
Alexander
Politicians from Glasgow
People from Fairfax County, Virginia
People from Dumfries, Virginia
British emigrants to the Thirteen Colonies